Ephysteris diminutella is a moth in the family Gelechiidae. It was described by Zeller in 1847. It is found in Spain, France, Italy, Romania, North Macedonia, Greece and Russia, as well as on Sicily. Outside of Europe, it is found in North Africa and Palestine.

References

Ephysteris
Moths described in 1847